Lane House, or variations such as Lane Cottage and Lane Farm, may refer to:

in the United States (by state then city)
Lane-Kendrick-Sherling House, Greenville, Alabama, listed on the NRHP in Butler County, Alabama
Lane-Towers House, Jacksonville, Florida, NRHP-listed in Duval County
House at 7245 San Jose Boulevard, Jacksonville, Florida, also known as the Lane House, NRHP-listed in Duval County
Lane House (Kensington, Georgia), listed on the NRHP in Walker County, Georgia
Henry S. Lane House, Crawfordsville, Indiana, NRHP-listed in Montgomery County, Indiana
Lucius and Maria Clinton Lane House, Charles City, Iowa, listed on the NRHP in Floyd County, Iowa
Samuel M. Lane House, Marion, Iowa, listed on the NRHP in Linn County, Iowa
Lane Farm (Lancaster, Kentucky), listed on the NRHP in Garrard County, Kentucky
Lane Plantation House, Ethel, Louisiana, listed on the NRHP in East Feliciana Parish, Louisiana
Job Lane House, Bedford, Massachusetts, listed on the NRHP in Middlesex County, Massachusetts
David Lane House, Bedford, Massachusetts, listed on the NRHP in Middlesex County, Massachusetts
Fitz Hugh Lane House, Gloucester, Massachusetts, listed on the NRHP in Essex County, Massachusetts
Anthony Lane House, Lancaster, Massachusetts, listed on the NRHP in Worcester County, Massachusetts
John Lane House, Vicksburg, Mississippi, listed on the NRHP in Warren County, Mississippi
Edward H. Lane House, Littleton, New Hampshire, listed on the NRHP in Grafton County, New Hampshire
Deacon Samuel and Jabez Lane Homestead, Stratham, New Hampshire, listed on the NRHP in Rockingham County, New Hampshire
Lane Cottage (Saranac Lake, New York), listed on the NRHP in Essex County
Lane House, Edenton, North Carolina, originally constructed in 1718
Joel Lane House, Raleigh, North Carolina, listed on the NRHP in Wake County, North Carolina
Lane-Bennett House, Raleigh, North Carolina, listed on the NRHP in Wake County, North Carolina
Lane-Hooven House, Hamilton, Ohio, listed on the NRHP in Butler County, Ohio
Ebenezer Lane House, Sandusky, Ohio, listed on the NRHP in Erie County, Ohio
Lane Cabin, Beaver City, Oklahoma, listed on the NRHP in Beaver County, Oklahoma
Lane House (Mercersburg, Pennsylvania), listed on the NRHP in Franklin County
Collier-Lane-Crichlow House, Murfreesboro, Tennessee, listed on the NRHP in Rutherford County, Tennessee
Lane-Riley House, Georgetown, Texas, listed on the NRHP in Williamson County, Texas
Lane-Tarkington House, Victoria, Texas, listed on the NRHP in Victoria County, Texas